Raíssa Rocha Machado (born 17 May 1996) is a Brazilian Paralympic javelin thrower.

Career 
Machado competed at the 2015 Parapan American Games, where she won a bronze medal. At the 2019 Parapan American Games, she won a gold medal.

Machado finished sixth at the 2016 Summer Paralympics. She qualified for the 2020 Summer Paralympics.

References

1996 births
Living people
Paralympic athletes of Brazil
Brazilian female javelin throwers
Athletes (track and field) at the 2016 Summer Paralympics
Medalists at the 2015 Parapan American Games
Medalists at the 2019 Parapan American Games
Medalists at the World Para Athletics Championships
Athletes (track and field) at the 2020 Summer Paralympics
Medalists at the 2020 Summer Paralympics
Paralympic silver medalists for Brazil
Paralympic medalists in athletics (track and field)
21st-century Brazilian women